Cubophis caymanus, the  Grand Cayman racer, is a species of snake in the family Colubridae. The species is native to Grand Cayman.

References

Cubophis
Snakes of North America
Reptiles described in 1887
[[Category:Taxa named by Samuel Garman]